Elazar Fleckeles (August 26, 1754 in Prague – April 27, 1826) was a Bohemian rabbi and author.

Biography
At the age of twenty-four he became rabbi of Kojetein, a small town in Moravia. In 1780 he was appointed dayan (rabbinic judge) in his native city Prague. Later he accepted the office of rabbi of the beth midrash founded by Joachim Edler von Popper and Israel Fränkel. Fleckeles was renowned for his scholarship and oratorical gifts, and for his skill in worldly affairs. He twice had audience with Emperor Francis I, and enjoyed a good relationship with the royal censor, Carl Fisher, even printing a teshuva to Fisher in his responsa.

In a fashion similar to that of his mentor Landau, Fleckeles viewed the threat that Sabbatianism posed to tradition, in particular to the centrality of Talmud and its study, as emanating from excesses of mysticism. Hence even legitimate Kabbalah and its derived practices, such as prefacing mystical intentional formulae to the recitation of blessings, should, he believed, play no public role. Rather, as in days of yore, such practices should become esoteric observances restricted to a learned elite. Fleckeles states unequivocally that if one would claim to be the Messiah because of his broad knowledge of the Kabbalah, he would not be believed if his knowledge of the Talmud was deficient.

Fleckeles also denounced Reform Judaism, joining with his Prague colleagues in condemning the Hamburg Temple reforms in particular.

Works
Fleckeles was a prolific author. Among his works are:
Olas Chodesh, in four parts, containing sermons, including a criticism of Moses Mendelssohn's translation of the Pentateuch
Ahavas David, an address directed against the followers of Shabsai Tzvi and Jacob Frank (Prague, 1785-1800) 
Teshuva MeAhava, responsa, in three parts (the responsum concerning Elazar Hakalir is often quoted by writers on Jewish hymnology) (Prague, 1800–21) 
A funeral sermon on the occasion of the death of Joachim Edler von Popper, (1795) 
Melekhet ha-Ḳodesh, two funeral sermons and two essays on the holy names of God which occur in the Scriptures
Nefesh David veNefesh Chayyah, on the death of his parents, ib. 1812;
Ma'ase de-Rabbi Eliezer, a commentary on the Haggadah of Passover, ib. (1812) 
Mevasser Tov, two sermons delivered on the occasion of the victory of the  Austrian army at Naples in 1821 (1821) 
Ḥazon la-Mo'ed, a part of his Sefer ha-Doresh (1824) 
Milli de-Avos, a commentary on Pirkei Avos 
Mille de-Oraisa, sermons

References

External links

Works
Teshuva MeAhava vol. one
Teshuva MeAhava vol. two
Teshuva MeAhava vol. three
 Maaseh Berabi Elazar
Olas Chodesh, vol. one
Olas Chodesh, vol. two (incomplete)
Olas Chodesh, vol. three
Ahavas David
Nefesh Dovid VeNefesh Chaya
Chazon Lamoed
Melaches Hakodesh
Limud HaTorah Beleil Nittel (pp. 165-167)

Biographical information
Jewish Encyclopedia: Fleckeles, Eleazar ben David 
YIVO Encyclopedia: Fleckeles, Elazar ben David
R' Fleckeles relationship with Karl Fischer
Eliezer Brodt, Some New Seforim, Books, R’ Eleazar Fleckeles, R’ Naftali Herz Weisel, Frankism And (Of Course) Censorship, PT. I

19th-century Czech rabbis
Czech Orthodox rabbis
Rabbis of Prague
Exponents of Jewish law
1754 births
1826 deaths
18th-century Bohemian rabbis